The Monitor, the Miners, and the Shree is a science fiction novel by Lee Killough, first published in paperback by Del Rey Books in April 1980.

Plot summary
The Monitor, the Miners, and the Shree is a novel in which a sociological expedition is conducted on the planet of Nira regarding the culture of the Shree who live there.

Reception
Greg Costikyan in Ares Magazine #3 commented that the book "is a well-crafted adventure story, of the sort Poul Anderson used to write, and is well worth reading."

Reviews
Dean R. Lambe in Science Fiction Review, August 1980
John Clute in The Magazine of Fantasy & Science Fiction, December 1980
Allan Magnus (1980) in Megavore 12, Dec. 1, 1980.
Kliatt

References

1980 novels
American science fiction novels